Billy (Jang Hwan) Kim (Hangul: 김장환) (born 1934) is a prominent Christian evangelist and humanitarian. He was the president of the Baptist World Alliance from 2000 until 2005 when he was succeeded by David Coffey.

Early life
Billy Kim was born in Suwon, Korea on July 25, 1934 into a poor farming family with three older brothers and an older sister. Born during the final years of the Japanese occupation, as a child he dreamed of becoming a politician in order to help his countrymen. When the Korean War broke out in June 1950, the Kim family could not escape thus enduring the hardships of war in Suwon.  Billy worked as a houseboy for the U. S. military under Sgt. Carl Powers, who helped him go to America to get an education. He left Korea on November 12, 1951. Carl Powers enrolled Billy at Bob Jones University in Greenville, South Carolina where Billy converted to Christianity. Early on in his college career, Kim won a South Carolina speech contest with a speech entitled “I Speak for Democracy”. He began preaching at small country churches on weekends. He earned a Bachelor of Arts in Biblical Studies in 1956.

In August 1958, Billy married Gertrude "Trudy" Stephens whom he met at Bob Jones University.  

In February 1959, Billy was ordained at Dante Baptist Church, and in November of that year received his master's degree.

Career
Billy Kim first began to work with Suwon Central Baptist Church on January 1, 1960, when it had only 10 members. In 2005, the congregation has grown to over 15,000,  including 100 members in an English speaking congregation founded by Billy and his wife Trudy. He retired from the post of senior pastor on December 19, 2004 and was succeeded by Rev. Myung Jin Ko, formerly senior pastor of Osan Baptist Church, on January 2, 2005.

Billy is the Chairman of the Far East Broadcasting Company in Korea.

Ministry

The Days of Ministry
When Billy returned to Korea in 1959, he and Trudy began their ministry in Suwon. Evangelism, pastoral work and youth ministry highlighted Billy’s first year. There were only a dozen members when they began serving at Suwon Central Baptist Church in 1959 and now there are over 15,000. In 1966, Billy Kim began a Youth for Christ ministry in Suwon, Korea following the lead of other Christian leaders and missionaries who had already founded Youth for Christ in Seoul in 1960, and trained many leaders. He raised $200,000 through an international tour to build a Christian Center for YFC where young people could study and have fellowship. He established a Job Training School, Central Kindergarten, Christian Night School and Capital Baptist Seminary. In 1994, Central Christian Academy was built and in the years that followed, hundreds of children and their parents have become Christians because of the church’s concern for early education in Suwon. As a result of his assistance to the underprivileged, he was the recipient of the Lions Clubs International Humanitarian Award in July 2004.

Billy Kim translated for Rev. Billy Graham during the 1973 Crusade.  His interpretive skill was marked by speed, accuracy, and enthusiasm. Each night the crowd grew to a maximum attendance of 1.1 million. Thousands of people gave their lives to Christ through the crusade, which greatly contributed to church growth in Korea.

Borderless Ministry 
In 2000, Kim became the first Asian to be elected as President of the Baptist World Alliance. As BWA President, he has had the privilege of meeting many world leaders. Continuing an active and broad international ministry he has been invited to many large Christian rallies all over the world and has become a famous speaker. His preaching opportunities include the Billy Graham Evangelists’ Conference in Amsterdam, a crusade in Nagaland, India; Promise Keeper’s Rallies in Anaheim, California and Atlanta, Georgia; a YFC rally in Moscow and many more.

Dr. Kim’s schedule is always packed with preaching and meetings. He is willing to go wherever the gospel is needed and meet with whoever needs his help. More than 400 international delegates joined 500 Cuban pastors and Christian leaders in Havana, Cuba for the Baptist World Alliance General Council meeting where Dr. Kim was installed as the President. It was his privilege, along with selected conference delegates, to visit with Fidel Castro who was very grateful to receive the Spanish Bible, which Dr. Kim presented to him.

Family
Billy Kim and his wife Trudy have three children: Joseph Carl, Mary Kay, and John William. They have ten grandchildren.

References

External links 
 Official website  

Living people
South Korean Baptists
20th-century Baptist ministers
21st-century Baptist ministers
1934 births